The Whetstone River (in French: rivière Whetstone) is a tributary of the Palmer River whose current flows successively into the Bécancour River, then on the south shore of the St. Lawrence River .

The Whetstone River flows in the municipality of Saint-Pierre-de-Broughton, in the Les Appalaches Regional County Municipality (MRC), in the administrative region of Chaudière-Appalaches, in Quebec, in Canada.

Geography 

The main neighboring watersheds of the Whetstone River are:
 north side: Palmer East River;
 east side: Palmer East River;
 south side: Palmer River;
 west side: Palmer River.

From the head area (route du 9e rang), the Whetstone River flows over  divided into the following segments:
  northwesterly, to a road bridge;
  west, to the 11e rang road bridge, located in the village of Saint-Pierre-de-Broughton;
  west, passing south of the village of Saint-Pierre-de-Broughton, to its confluence.

The Whetstone River drains on the east bank of the Palmer River in the Municipality of Saint-Pierre-de-Broughton.

Toponymy 
The toponym "Whetstone River" was made official on December 5, 1968, at the Commission de toponymie du Québec.

See also 

 List of rivers of Quebec

References 

Rivers of Chaudière-Appalaches
Les Appalaches Regional County Municipality